KIAK-FM (102.5 MHz) is a commercial country radio station in Fairbanks, Alaska.

The frequency originally belonged to KQRZ until KIAK (now KFBX) decided to move their country music format to FM in 1990.

Former logo

References

External links

Country radio stations in the United States
IAK-FM
Radio stations established in 1983
1984 establishments in Alaska
IHeartMedia radio stations